The 2023 season will be the Indianapolis Colts' upcoming 71st season in the National Football League and their 40th in Indianapolis. It will also be their seventh under the leadership of general manager Chris Ballard and the first under new head coach Shane Steichen. They will attempt to improve on their 4–12–1 record from last year, make the playoffs after a two-year absence, and end their 8-year AFC South title drought.

Draft

Staff

Current roster

Preseason
The Colts' preseason opponents and schedule will be announced in the spring.

Regular season

2023 opponents
Listed below are the Colts' opponents for 2023. Exact dates and times will be announced in the spring.

References

External links
 

Indianapolis
Indianapolis Colts seasons
Indianapolis Colts